The Apostolic Administration of Český Těšín was a short-lived (1947-78) pre-diocesan Latin Catholic jurisdiction in Czechoslovakia.

History 
 Established in 1947 as the Apostolic Administration of Český Těšín (named after the Moravian-Silesian Region see, alias Teschen), on canonical territory split off from the German and then Polish Archdiocese of Breslau, renamed as Archdiocese of Wrocław in 1972.
 Suppressed on 31 May 1978, its territory being merged into the Czech Metropolitan Archdiocese of Olomouc (Olomütz, also Moravia).

Ordinaries 
(both Roman Rite)

Apostolic Administrators of Český Těšín 
 Monsignor František Onderek (1947 – death 1962.10.24)
uncanonical: Father Antonín Veselý (born Austria) (1962 – retired 1977), died 1983.

See also 
 List of Catholic dioceses in the Czech Republic
 List of Catholic dioceses in Poland
 List of Catholic dioceses (structured view)

Sources and external links 
 GCatholic - data for all sections

Apostolic administrations
Former Roman Catholic dioceses in Europe
Suppressed Roman Catholic dioceses